Jose Chaves Alvarez (born June 29, 1944), known by initials JCA, is a Filipino businessman and politician from the province of Palawan, Philippines who is serving as the representative of Palawan's 2nd congressional district since 2022. He previously served as the Governor of the province from 2013 to 2022.

Early life and education 
Jose Alvarez was born on June 29, 1944 in Kidapawan, Province of Cotabato, to his parents Engr. Tomas Alvarez and Mrs. Lilia Alvarez. At the age of six, he started his education at the Jesuit-run Ateneo de Davao University. He then pursued his secondary education at San Nicholas College, now St. Paul University Surigao, and finished the same in 1960.

When he was 16 years old, Alvarez took Chemical Engineering at Cebu Institute of Technology – University. But due to financial constraints, he was forced to transfer to Xavier University and enroll in Liberal Arts. Because he wanted to help his family and avoid becoming a burden to his parents, the young Jose financed his university education by working as a collector in an insurance agency. Through his own perseverance and skills, he was able to graduate from college in 1964.

Business career 
After his graduation, Alvarez ventured into a small used-car trading business in Cagayan de Oro . In 1969, he was able to expand his business to Mandaue. In 1970, he was presented an opportunity to start a logging business in Indonesia and immediately grabbed the same. He stayed in the forests of Indonesia for seven years, before returning to the province of Palawan.

References

External links
Province of Palawan Official Website

Living people
Governors of Palawan
1944 births
People from Cotabato
Nationalist People's Coalition politicians
PDP–Laban politicians